The States of Guernsey, officially the States of Deliberation and sometimes referred to as the Government of Guernsey, is the parliament and government of the British Crown dependency of Guernsey. Some laws and ordinances approved by the States of Guernsey also apply to Alderney and Sark (the other component parts of the Bailiwick of Guernsey) as "Bailiwick-wide legislation" with the consent of the governments of those islands.  All enactments of the States of Guernsey apply to Herm as well as Guernsey, since Herm is directly administered by the Bailiwick of Guernsey.

When constituted as a legislature, it is officially called the States of Deliberation. When constituted as an electoral college, it is officially called the States of Election.

The executive functions of the States are carried out using a committee system, formed of one Senior Committee, six Principal Committees and several other Committees Boards, Authorities and Commissions.

Legislation passed by the States is termed Laws (Loi), which take effect in the island by Order-in-Council. Minor and secondary legislation does not require the assent of the King-in-Council and are known as Ordinances (Ordonnances).

History 
The legislature derives its name from the estates (French: états) of the Crown, the Church and the people from whom the assembly was originally summoned. The Jurats, representing the Crown, and the representatives of the Church of England were replaced in the constitutional reforms following the Second World War, when the office of Conseiller was introduced.

Until 2000, there were 33 Deputies elected with three year mandates, and 12 Conseillers representing the Bailiwick, serving terms of six years, with half being elected every three. The Conseillers were not originally directly elected by the people (although latterly directly elected by Bailiwick-wide vote), and the office was abolished before the General Election held that year. The 10 Douzaine representatives (representing parish authorities) were removed from the States in the 2004 constitutional reform and the total of elected deputies rose to the 45 total. In 2016 the number of deputies was reduced to 38.

Following a 2018 referendum, the whole island now forms a single constituency returning 38 members by plurality-at-large voting, beginning with the the 2020 election.

Composition 

The States of Deliberation consists of 38 People's Deputies, elected every four years from a single island-wide constituency by plurality-at-large voting, each voter being allowed to cast up to 38 votes. Before the 2020 election, the electoral system was multi-member districts by plurality block voting, in which each voter can vote for as many candidates as there are seats in the district. Two Alderney Deputies are appointed by the States of Alderney to represent Alderney's interest in matters delegated by Alderney to Guernsey under the 1948 Agreement. The Alderney Representatives are full members of the States of Deliberation but are unpaid, and are chosen from the 10 members of the States of Alderney after an Alderney-wide plebiscite.

There are also two non-voting members being the Law Officers of the Crown - the Procureur (Attorney General) and the Comptroller (Solicitor General) both appointed by the monarch. The Bailiff presides over the States.

Committee system
Guernsey's government operates on a committee system. A similar system used to be used in the neighbouring bailiwick, Jersey, however, this was abolished and replaced with a ministerial government in 2005.

The Senior Committee is known as the Policy & Resources Committee. It is the leading body and in charge of co-ordination of policy and other States work. It oversees the functioning of the States and also has responsibilities for external affairs. The President of the Committee is often termed "Chief Minister" by the local media, as they are perceived to represent the island's government, especially abroad. They are elected by States Members. The incumbent President is Deputy Peter Febrache.

The remaining Principal Committees are listed below:

The remaining committees, all chaired by States Members, are the Development and Planning Authority, Transport Licensing Authority, Overseas Aid & Development Commission, States' Trading Supervisory Board, States Assembly & Constitution Committee, Scrutiny Management Committee and the Civil Contingencies Authority.

Elections
The last general election was on 7 October 2020.

 2020 results
 2016 results
 2012 results
 2008 results
 2004 results

Current deputies and representatives
Constitution of the States of Deliberation :

Deputies

Alderney representatives
 Steve Roberts
 Alex Snowdon

See also
 States of Jersey
 The States
 List of Laws of Guernsey

References

External links
 

Politics of Guernsey
Government of Guernsey
Guernsey